Surutapalle is a village in Chittoor district of the Indian state of Andhra Pradesh. It is located in Nagalapuram mandal of Tirupati revenue division.

Tourism 
Palli Kondeswara temple is a Hindu temple dedicated to the Shiva, located in Surutapalle. It is one of the religious tourist and pilgrim destination in the district. Lord Siva is in sleeping posture on the lap of Sarvamangala Devi (Parvati Devi) and such unique posture is nowhere else in the world.

References 

Villages in Chittoor district